Gotan is a village in Raina II CD block in Bardhaman Sadar South subdivision of Purba Bardhaman district in the state of West Bengal, India.

Geography

Urbanisation
95.54% of the population of Bardhaman Sadar South subdivision live in the rural areas. Only 4.46% of the population live in the urban areas, and that is the lowest proportion of urban population amongst the four subdivisions in Purba Bardhaman district. The map alongside presents some of the notable locations in the subdivision. All places marked in the map are linked in the larger full screen map.

Location
.

Demographics
As per the 2011 Census of India Gotan had a total population of 4,458, of which 2,246 (50%) were males and 2,212 (50%) were females. Population below 6 years was 492. The total number of literates in Gotan was 2,882 (72.67% of the population over 6 years).

Transport
Gotan is on Kabikankan Mukundaram Road running from Raina to State Highway 2 (West Bengal) (also known as Ahalyabai Holkar Road in the area).

Education
Acharya Sukumar Sen Mahavidyalaya was established at Gotan in 2013.

Gotan Subodh Memorial High School is a coeducational high school affiliated with the West Board of Secondary Education. It is also affiliated with West Bengal Council of Higher Secondary Education for higher secondary classes.

Healthcare
There is a primary health centre at Gotan (with 6 beds).

References

Villages in Purba Bardhaman district